Zardaín is one of 44 parishes (administrative divisions) in Tineo, a municipality within the province and autonomous community of Asturias, in northern Spain.

Villages and hamlets
 Freisnéu
 Zardaín

External links
Official website 

Parishes in Tineo